Peter Van Tu Nguyen  (Yuen Wan-tsz, ; 1 October 1943 – 16 June 2020), was a judge and Queen's Counsel from Hong Kong. 

Nguyen was born in Vietnam and moved to Hong Kong in 1948.

He served as the Crown Prosecutor of Hong Kong between 1994 and 1997, and was the first Director of Public Prosecution of Asian descent in the territory. He went on to serve as a judge in the Court of First Instance of the territory's High Court in 1997 until retirement in 2008.  In 1999, he served as the presiding judge in the Hello Kitty murder case.

He was succeeded by Grenville Cross as the Crown Prosecutor.

He later served as a member of Torture Claims Appeal Board.

Nguyen died at home on 16 June 2020.

References

1943 births
Hong Kong judges
Hong Kong people of Hoa descent
Place of birth missing
Hong Kong Senior Counsel
20th-century King's Counsel
Vietnamese emigrants to Hong Kong
Recipients of the Silver Bauhinia Star
2020 deaths
Hong Kong Queen's Counsel